Jaret Townsend (born January 29, 1998) is an American soccer player.

Career

Youth, college & amateur 
Townsend spent a season with USSDA side Real Colorado prior to attending college.

Townsend went on to play four years of college soccer at the University of Washington between 2016 and 2019, where he made a total of 75 appearances for the Huskies, scoring 9 goals and tallying 6 assists.

While at college, Townsend played with USL PDL side Colorado Rapids U23 in 2017, and NPSL side Crossfire Redmond in 2019.

Professional 
On January 13, 2020, Townsend was selected 58th overall in the 2020 MLS SuperDraft by Sporting Kansas City. On March 6, 2020, Townsend signed with Kansas City's USL Championship side Sporting Kansas City II.

Townsend made his professional debut on July 18, 2020, appearing as an 85th-minute substitute in a 2-1 loss to Indy Eleven.

Townsend retired from professional soccer on November 30, 2020.

References

External links 
 Washington Huskies Washington Huskies bio
 

1998 births
American soccer players
Association football midfielders
Colorado Rapids U-23 players
Living people
National Premier Soccer League players
People from Highlands Ranch, Colorado
Soccer players from Colorado
Sporting Kansas City draft picks
Sporting Kansas City II players
Sportspeople from the Denver metropolitan area
USL Championship players
USL League Two players
Washington Crossfire players